Samango is a town in northwestern Ivory Coast. It is a sub-prefecture of Gbéléban Department in Kabadougou Region, Denguélé District.

Samango was a commune until March 2012, when it became one of 1126 communes nationwide that were abolished.

In 2014, the population of the sub-prefecture of Samango was 11,215.

Villages
The 18 villages of the sub-prefecture of Samango and their population in 2014 are:

References

Sub-prefectures of Kabadougou
Former communes of Ivory Coast